Richard Dyer (born 1945) is an English academic who held a professorship in the Department of Film Studies at King's College London. Specialising in cinema (particularly Italian cinema), queer theory, and the relationship between entertainment and representations of race, sexuality, and gender, he was previously a faculty member of the Film Studies Department at the University of Warwick for many years and has held a number of visiting professorships in the United Kingdom, the United States, Italy, Sweden, Denmark, and Germany.

Career
Born in Leeds to a lower-middle class Conservative Party supporting family and raised in the suburbs of London during the 1940s and 1950s, Dyer studied French (as well as English, German, and Philosophy) at the University of St Andrews. He then went on to earn his doctoral degree in English at the University of Birmingham’s Centre for Contemporary Cultural Studies.  During the 1970s, Dyer authored articles for the Gay Left and then during the 1980s wrote for Marxism Today, the theoretical journal of the "Eurocommunist" or Gramscian wing of the Communist Party of Great Britain.  These writings were mostly cultural criticism rather than class politics based, with titles such as "In Defence of Disco" (1979) and "Diana Ross" (1982).  In the early 1980s he contributed to the partwork The Movie, notably with a partially critical piece on Barbra Streisand.

Before coming to King's College London in 2006, he was a Professor of Film Studies at the University of Warwick and a visiting professor at the following institutions: University of Pennsylvania’s Annenberg School of Communications in 1985; the Istituto Universitario Orientale in 1987; Stockholm University in 1996, 2006, and 2010; the University of Copenhagen in 2002; New York University in 2003; the University of Bergamo in 2004; Bauhaus-Universitat Weimar in 2009; the University of St. Andrews in 2011. Throughout his career, he has taught courses on race and ethnicity, film, stardom, Hollywood, Italian cinema, Federico Fellini, and representation. He was also very involved in graduate education, and supervised dissertations on subjects ranging from the history of gay cinema during the 1970s to experimental animation. Having already published widely on whiteness, film, and lesbian and gay cultures, Dyer  published journal articles and book chapters on song in Italian cinema and whiteness in the film, Dirty Dancing.

White: Essays on Race and Culture
Published by Routledge in 1997, White examines the reproduction and preservation of whiteness in visual culture from roughly the 15th century to the late 20th century. From biblical images of the crucifixion to lithographs of Little Eva from Harriet Beecher Stowe’s Uncle Tom’s Cabin to photographs of the Prince and Princess of Wales during the 1980s, the broad scope of this text allows Dyer to illustrate how whiteness has been and continues to be both invisible and hypervisible, everywhere and nowhere. Whiteness as both invisible and hypervisible occurs, Dyer argues, because whiteness is both registered on the individual body (through phenotype, behaviour, language, performances of class and sexuality, etc.) and exists beyond the corporeal. Understanding whiteness as being embodied within yet existing beyond corporeal subjects is accomplished through the lens of Christianity, race (or more specifically, notions of racial difference observed through differently appearing bodies), and imperialism. Central to these three political projects is what Dyer calls "the sexual reproductive economy of race", which signifies the ways in which whiteness is preserved and also threatened by heterosexuality (e.g. the conception of white offspring versus interracial relations that produce mixed race offspring). Hence the importance of images of the heterosexual white couple that will presumably preserve whiteness by conceiving white children.

One of the most compelling parts of his argument is the intra-racial boundary work among whites. Gender and class create a hierarchy among whites, wherein women are read as whiter ("purer") than men and those of a higher class status are whiter than the lower classes. The third chapter, "The Light of the World", is particularly important to this intra-racial boundary work in that it examines the relationship between beauty and whiteness and how white women are visually presented as whiter than their male counterparts through the use of light. Dyer is in conversation with scholars such as David Roediger (author of The Wages of Whiteness, 1991), Tamsin Wilton (author of Immortal, Invisible: Lesbians and the Moving Image, 1995) and Susan Jeffords (author of Hard Bodies: Hollywood Masculinity in the Reagan Era, 1994); and is therefore contributing to whiteness studies, film studies, and gender/sexuality studies.

Other notable works
Stars (1979) was Dyer's first full-length book. In it he develops the idea that viewers' experience of a film is heavily influenced by the perception of its stars. Dyer analyses critics' writing, magazines, advertising and films to explore the significance of stardom, with particular reference to Marlon Brando, Bette Davis, Marlene Dietrich, Jane Fonda, Greta Garbo, Marilyn Monroe, Robert Redford, Joan Crawford and John Wayne.

Heavenly Bodies: Film Stars and Society (1986) continues Dyer's extensive contribution to star studies. Judy Garland, Paul Robeson, and Marilyn Monroe are the subjects of this text, and yet they are not what Dyer is most interested in. Instead, Dyer looks closely at the ways in which audiences simultaneously construct and consume a particular star's persona, in the process debunking common stereotypes about Garland, Monroe, and Robeson.

In his 2001 The Culture of Queers, Dyer unpacks the oversimplified term "queer", arguing that it is a sexual identity not merely about specific sexual activities, but defines men who are attracted to other men and who possess other non-sexual attributes like being effeminate or hyper-masculine. Analysing films genres like film noir and queer actors like Rock Hudson, Dyer frames the trajectory of queer identification and culture with two major historical moments: the first use of the term "homosexual" in 1869 and the Stonewall Riots. Although well received within the academic community, some scholars have criticised the absence of lesbianism in Dyer's definitions and delineation of queer cultural history.

In his 2011 In the Space of a Song: the Uses of Song in Film, Dyer analyses film musicals like Meet Me in St. Louis and A Star is Born  to examine the role of song in film through the lens of race, gender, and sexuality.

Throughout his career he has been commissioned by the British Film Institute to write film analyses, some of which include Seven (1999) and Brief Encounter (1993). Thus Dyer is recognised as both an academic and film critic.

Public intellectual life
Outside academia, gay critic Dyer was an active and influential figure in the English Gay Liberation Front and  contributed to the journal Gay Left.  For example, his article ‘In Defence of Disco’ in Gay Left (1979), was one of the first to take disco seriously as an expression of the new gay consciousness.  In his article, Dyer defends the genre of disco from critics that do not support it because of its crossover from the margins to mainstream.  While critics say disco traded in its values for profit, Dyer maintains his support for the genre.  He argues that just because something is affiliated with capitalism does not mean that it is capitalistic itself.  He goes on to say that Disco is more than music; it is a culture, dance style, and language, and that it would take more than a crossover into mainstream to negate its significance.  In addition to contributing to this journal, Dyer has also organized the first gay cinema event at the National Film Theatre in 1977. The event was accompanied by the publication of Gays and Film, a collection of essays he edited.

Dyer has also appeared in several television documentaries. In 1991, he appeared in Alma Cogan: The Girl with the Giggle In Her Voice. In 1995 he contributed to the television documentary The Celluloid Closet, a history of depictions of lesbians and gay men in American films, which was first screened in the UK on Channel 4 on 5 September 1996. Five years later when the documentary was released on DVD, unused material was edited together to form a one-hour show entitled Rescued From the Closet.

Awards
 Society for Cinema and Media Studies Honorary Life Membership, 2007
 Honorary Doctorate, University of Turku, 2007
 Distinguished Adjunct Professor in Film Studies, University College Dublin, 2009
 James Robert Brudner '83 Memorial Prize, Yale University, 2014-2015
 Honorary Doctorate, Bordeaux Montaigne University, 2018

Selected bibliography

Books

Journal articles

See also
 Gay icon
 Queer Cinema
 Queer Theory

References

External links
 Richard Dyer at the IKKM, Weimar
 
 
 
 
 Interview Richard Dyer at Birmingham University

1945 births
Living people
English film critics
British gay writers
Gay academics
British LGBT rights activists
Academics of King's College London
Academics of the University of Warwick
LGBT studies academics